Even Now is the fifty-sixth studio album by American country music singer Conway Twitty and the last to be released during his lifetime. It was released in 1991 on MCA Records, and includes the hits "She's Got a Man on Her Mind" and "Who Did They Think He Was".

"She's Got a Man on Her Mind" was previously released as a 1989 single by the co-writer Curtis Wright, reaching No. 38 on the Hot Country Songs chart on December 23, 1989. "Someday You'll Love Me" was later recorded by singer-songwriter Jeff Knight for his 1993 Mercury Records album Easy Street.

Track listing

Production
Produced By Conway Twitty & Dee Henry
Engineer: Steve Tillisch
Second Engineers: Jeff Coppage, Marty Williams
Mixing: John Guess
Digital Editing: Milan Bogdan
Mastering: Glenn Meadows

Personnel
Drums: Paul Leim
Bass Guitar: David Hungate
Keyboards: John Barlow Jarvis
Synthesizer: Mike Lawler
Acoustic Guitar: Pat Flynn, Billy Joe Walker Jr.
Electric Guitar: Billy Joe Walker Jr.
Lead Vocals: Conway Twitty 
Backing Vocals: Vince Gill, Even Stevens (track 9), Curtis Young

References

1991 albums
Conway Twitty albums
MCA Records albums